Matha is a 2012 Sri Lankan Sinhala and Tamil romantic war film directed by Boodee Keerthisena and co-produced by Ruwan Jayasingha, Sanath Ranaweera and Vijaya Rathnayake. It stars Darshan Dharmaraj and Yasodha Radhakrishnan in lead roles along with Thumindu Dodantenna and Raja Ganeshan. Music composed by Lakshman Joseph De Saram. It is the 1244th film in the Sri Lankan cinema.

Plot
The story revolves around two lovers who are LTTE carders fighting for a separate land. The film deals with the moments of final battle of Eelam war in Sri Lanka, while the two characters struggle to find their way to protect their expected child.

Cast
 Darshan Dharmaraj as Yoga
 Yasodha Radhakrishnan	as Parvati
 Divya Dharshanee as Young Parvati
 Dharmapriya Dias as Lt. Dias
 Thumindu Dodantenna as Nimal
 Raja Ganeshan	as Parvati and Puri's father
 Mallika Keerthi as Parvati and Puri's mother
 Gayan Perera
 K.M Pavithra as Puri, Parvati's brother
 Kriz Chris as Foreign Journalist
 Buddhika Jayarathne as Damitha
 Vimukthi Jayasundara as Kamal
 Dasun Pathirana as Lucky	
 Mahendra Perera as Galariya
 Ravindra Randeniya as Brigadier
 Wasantha Vittacchi as Sergeant Major Valikala
 Rakith Warawitage as Jude

Awards
The film has won eight awards in two different film festivals for the best cinematography, editing, music, Visual effects, make up, child actor including two SIGNIS awards 2013.

 2013 Derana Lux Film Festival Award for the Best VFX - Buddhi Keerthisena 
 2013 Derana Lux Film Festival Award for the Best makeup -  Wasantha Wittachchi and Upul Mahanama
 2013 Derana Lux Film Festival Award for the Best Child Actor - K. M. Pavithra 
 2013 Derana Lux Film Festival Award for the Best Editor - Steven Phillipson
 2013 Derana Lux Film Festival Award for the Best Cinematography - Milton Kam, Donald Karunaratne, Keta A. Dharmasena

References

External links
 
 මව් බිමේ හිමිකම් පතා - විශ්වනාත් බුද්ධික කීර්තිසේන නිර්මාණ

2010s Sinhala-language films
2012 films
Films shot in Sri Lanka
Films about the Sri Lankan Civil War
2010s war films
War romance films